Aïn Chock is a district, arrondissement and southern suburb of Casablanca, in the Casablanca-Settat region of Morocco, on the road to El Jadida. It is known for hosting the faculties of the Hassan II University. The district covers an area of 28.89 square kilometres (14.5 square miles), and as of 2004 had 253,496 inhabitants. The district contains one arrondissement, also named Aïn Chock.

References

Districts of Casablanca
Arrondissements of Casablanca